The UEFA European Under-19 Championship 2006 Final Tournament was held in Poland between 18 July and 29 July 2006. The top three teams in each group qualified for the 2007 FIFA U-20 World Cup. Players born after 1 January 1987 were allowed to participate in this competition.

Qualifications
There were two separate rounds of qualifications held before the Final Tournament.

1. 2006 UEFA European Under-19 Championship qualification
2. 2006 UEFA European Under-19 Championship elite qualification

Teams
The following teams had qualified for the tournament:

 
 
 
  (host)

Squads

Group stage

Group A

Group B

Knockout stage

Semi-finals

Final

Teams

Goalscorers
5 goals
 Alberto Bueno
 İlhan Parlak

4 goals
 Erwin Hoffer
 Juan Mata

3 goals
 Marek Střeštík
 Dawid Janczyk
 Roland Lamah
 Bruno Gama

Source: uefa.com

Qualification to U-20 World Cup
The six best performing teams qualified for the 2007 FIFA U-20 World Cup.

 
 
  (host)

External links
Official website at UEFA.com
Match list at rsssf.com

 
2006
UEFA
2006
European Under-19 Championship
July 2006 sports events in Europe
2006 in youth association football